Pierre-Étienne Labbé de Saint-Georges de Bar   was a French Navy officer. He fought in the War of American Independence.

Biography 
As an Ensign, Saint-Georges was captain of the 16-gun Lézard, which served as a courier for Suffren's squadron in the Indian Ocean. In September 1782, Dufreneau replaced him at the command of Lézard, as Saint-Georges was promoted to the command of the 32-gun frigate Fine, taking over from La Corne.

Sources and references 
 Notes

References

 Bibliography
 
 
 

External links
 

French Navy officers